Rusty Creek is a river in the Canadian province of Saskatchewan. The river's source is First Mustus Lake, which is a lake in Meadow Lake Provincial Park, and its mouth is along the course of the Waterhen River. It is a south flowing river and the entirety of its course is in Meadow Lake Provincial Park and the boreal forest ecozone. Rusty Creek is a tributary of Waterhen River, which is a major tributary of Beaver River of the Churchill River and in the Hudson Bay drainage basin.

Description
While Rusty Creek itself is relatively short, it has a comparatively large drainage basin that has its roots in the Mostoos Hills north of Meadow Lake Provincial Park. There are several small lakes and six notable lakes within its watershed. These include Rusty Lake, First Mustus Lake, Second Mustus Lake, Third Mustus Lake, Peitahigan Lake, and Fourth Mustus Lake. Rusty Lake is along the course of Rusty Creek and numerous creeks flow into the lakes including Dennis Creek, which flows into First Mustus Lake.

See also 
List of rivers of Saskatchewan
Hudson Bay drainage basin
Tourism in Saskatchewan

References 

Rivers of Saskatchewan
Meadow Lake No. 588, Saskatchewan
Division No. 17, Saskatchewan
Tributaries of Hudson Bay